Bingegang is a rural locality in the Central Highlands Region, Queensland, Australia. In the  Bingegang had a population of 18 people.

Geography
Bingegang is about 613 km away from Brisbane.

The Mackenzie River (the river) forms the northern and north-western boundary of the locality. Parker Creek forms part of the south-western boundary of the locality and then flows in a northerly direction through the locality to becomes a tributary of the Mackenzie River on the northern boundary. The south-eastern, southern and part of the south-western boundary of the locality roughly follows Return Creek, which is a tributary of Parker Creek.

The Fitzroy Developmental Road enters the locality from the south (Jellinbah) and exits to the north-west (the locality of Mackenzie River).

Bingegang Weir impounds the Mackenzie River. It is reached via Bingegan Weir Access Road.

The land use is predominantly grazing on native vegetation with some cropping in the north and south of the locality.

History 
Bingebgang Weir was completed in 1975 and raised in 1998.

In the  Bingegang had a population of 18 people.

Education 
There are no schools in Bingegang. The nearest primary schools at Dingo State Schol in Dingo to the south and Middlemount Community School in Middlemount to the north-west. The nearest secondary schools are Middlemount Community School in Middlemount to the north-west and Blackwater State High School in Blackwater to the south-west. However, all of these schools are sufficiently distant that distance education and boarding schools would be other options.

Attractions 

Reference 

Central Highlands Region
Localities in Queensland